Elections were held in Illinois on Tuesday, November 2, 2010. Primary elections were held on February 2, 2010.

Election information
2010 was a midterm election year in the United States.

Turnout

Primary election
For the primary election, turnout was 23.14%, with 1,758,489 votes cast. 

Turnout by county

General election
For the general election, turnout was 50.53%, with 3,792,770 votes cast.

Turnout by county

Federal elections

United States Senate 

Incumbent Democrat Roland Burris, appointed in 2009 by then-Governor Rod Blagojevich to fill the U.S. Senate seat that Barack Obama had vacated after being elected President of the United States, did not seek reelection.

U.S. Congressman Mark Kirk (Republican Party) won against State Treasurer Alexi Giannoulias (Democratic Party), Mike Labno (Libertarian Party), and football coach LeAlan Jones (Green Party) in both a regular election for the Senate seat and a coinciding special election to fill the remainder of Barack Obama's unexpired term.

United States House 

All Illinois seats in the United States House of Representatives were up for election in 2010.

The Republican Party flipped four Democratic-held seats, making the composition of Illinois' House delegation 11 Republicans and 8 Democrats.

State elections

Governor and Lieutenant Governor

Incumbent Governor Pat Quinn, who became governor after Rod Blagojevich was removed from office, was elected outright to his first full term.

Attorney General 

Incumbent Democratic Attorney General Lisa Madigan won reelection to a third term in office

Democratic primary

Republican primary

Green primary

General election

Secretary of State 

Incumbent Democratic Secretary of State Jesse White won reelection to a fourth term in office.

Democratic primary

Republican primary

Green primary

General election
Green Party nominee Adrian Frost withdrew before the election.

Comptroller 

Incumbent Comptroller Daniel Hynes, a Democrat, did not seek a fourth term. Republican Judy Baar Topinka was elected to succeed him.

Democratic primary

Republican primary

Green primary

General election

Treasurer 

Incumbent Treasurer Alexi Giannoulias, a Democrat, did not seek reelection to a second term, instead opting to run for United States Senate. Republican Dan Rutherford was elected to succeed him. , this is the last time a Republican was elected Illinois state treasurer.

Democratic primary

Republican primary

Green primary

General election

State Senate

One-third of the seats of the Illinois Senate were up for election in 2010.

State House of Representatives

All of the seats in the Illinois House of Representatives were up for election in 2010.

Judicial elections
Multiple judicial positions were up for election in 2010.
VoteForJudges.org

Ballot measure
One measure, the Governor recall amendment, was certified for the 2010 statewide election.

Illinois Governor Recall Amendment 

Voters approved the Illinois Governor Recall Amendment, allowing voters to hold recall elections of Illinois Governors. In order to be approved, the measure required either 60% support among those specifically voting on the amendment or 50% support among all ballots cast in the elections. The 60% support threshold was exceeded.

Local elections
Local elections were held. These included county elections, such as the Cook County elections.

Notes

References

General Election 2010: Offices and Candidates from the Illinois State Board of Elections

External links
Illinois State Board of Elections
Official candidate list
Candidates for Illinois State Offices at Project Vote Smart
Illinois at Ballotpedia
Illinois Election Guide at Congress.org
Illinois Polls at Pollster.com
Illinois at Rasmussen Reports
Finance
2010 House and Senate Campaign Finance for Illinois at the Federal Election Commission
Illinois Congressional Races in 2010 campaign finance data from OpenSecrets
Illinois 2010 campaign finance data from Follow the Money
Media
Election Center at the Chicago Tribune, all endorsements
Election 2010 at the Chicago Sun-Times, all endorsements
The 2010 Candidate Forums at Chicago Tonight

 
Illinois